Northern Territory Fire and Rescue Service, or NTFRS, (in conjunction with Bushfires NT) is the primary provider of fire and rescue services throughout the 1.35 million square km Northern Territory of Australia. It is made up of 27 fire stations, 16 being staffed by volunteer brigade units, 5 being staffed 24 hours a day by career fire fighters, and the remainder by a mix of career and auxiliary fire fighters.

The NTFRS is made up approximately 180 permanent staff working in the regional centres of Darwin, Alice Springs, Tennant Creek, Katherine, Nhulunbuy, Yulara and Jabiru, as well as 54 part-time auxiliaries and approximately 250 volunteers.

The NTFRS is part of the NT Government "Tri-Service", Northern Territory Police, Fire and Emergency Services, or NTPFES. The CEO of the NTPFES and Commissioner of Northern Territory Police is Mr Jamie Chalker, APM. The NTPFES falls under the portfolio of the Minister for Police, Fire and Emergency Services.

History 
Unlike many other Australian brigades the NTFRS is relatively young. The first permanent Chief Fire Officer took command of a newly formed Darwin civil brigade on 31 October 1941, however following the Bombing of Darwin by Japanese forces during World War II, fire fighting duties were assumed by the military after general evacuation of the civilian population. This made The Northern Territory Fire Service the only capital city Australian Fire Service to serve under enemy fire. It was not until 1946 that the Darwin civil brigade was reformed, with another small brigade formed in the large regional centre of Alice Springs in 1949.

The original Darwin fire station and fire service headquarters was located in Darwin city on Daly street, this station was closed and the Iliffe street station was opened in Oct 1988. Serving outer Darwin was the Winnellie Fire station opened in 1970–71, which was closed with the opening of the Palmerston Fire station in the newly formed satellite city of Palmerston in 1984. Serving the rural area of Darwin is the Humpty Doo station that was opened in 2005. To better serve the Northern suburbs of Darwin the old Casuarina station was closed and the new Marrara fire station was opened on 14 June 2007.

The history of the NTFRS was researched and written by former Assistant Commissioner of the NT Police Bill Wilson.

Organisational structure 
 Director/Chief Fire Officer – Mark Spain
 Deputy Chief Fire Officer Territory Operations – Stephen Sewell
 Assistant Chief Fire Officer Strategy and Capability – Joshua Fischer
 District Officer Fire Safety Command 
 District Officer Training and Development Command – Ian Lockley
 District Officer Darwin Command  
 District Officer Southern Command – David Letheby
 District Officer Northern Command – Gerry Seville
 District Officer Special Operations

Chief Fire Officers 
 Jul 2016 – current  Mark Spain
 Sep 2011 – Mar 2016 Steve Rothwell
 Jan 2005 – Jan 2011 Greg Nettleton
 Jan 2004 – Jan 2005 Thomas Konieczny
 Jan 2002 – Jan 2004 Daryl Pepper
 Jul 1992 – Jan 2002 Ian Rae
 Jul 1990 – Jul 1992 Kenneth Copeland
 Oct 1986 – Jul 1990 Geoffrey Skerritt
 Oct 1984 – Oct 1986 Jeffrey Godfredson
 Jul 1983 – Oct 1984 Alan Ferris
 Jul 1981 – Jul 1983 William Henderson
 Aug 1967 – Jul 1981 Peter Holtham
 Jun 1956 – Jul 1967 George Robbins

Fire Stations

Full Time Stations 

 Darwin
 Marrara (A suburb of Darwin)
 Palmerston
 Berrimah (A suburb of Darwin)
 Katherine
 Nhulunbuy
 Jabiru
 Tennant Creek
 Alice Springs
 Yulara
 Humpty Doo

Volunteer stations 
Alice Springs Rural (VFB), Bathurst Island (VFB), Virginia Bees Creek (VFB), Howard Springs (VFB), Humpty Doo (VFB), Koolpinyah (VFB), Larrimah (VFB), Yirrkala (VFB), Adelaide River (FERG), Bachelor (FERG), Borroloola (FERG), Elliott (FERG), Mataranka (FERG), Pine Creek (FERG), Timber Creek (FERG)

VFB – Volunteer Fire Brigade

FERG – Fire, Emergency and Rescue Group

NTFRS Resources 

NTFRS Vehicles include a new fleet of Scania medium and heavy pumpers, and older medium and heavy Freightliner pumps, an aerial appliance, numerous tankers and grass fire units, plus rescue, command and utility vehicles. The NTFRS also has trailers for Fire Investigation, Rapid Decontamination and a BA trailer for refilling SCBA Cylinders in the field.

Due to the relatively small size of the NTFRS, rather than having dedicated specialised sections, general firefighters are trained in various disciplines, including: HAZMAT, USAR, Road Crash Rescue, Paramedic, School Based Education, and Wildfire.

See also
Australasian Fire and Emergency Service Authorities Council

References

External links 
 Official NTFRS web site
 NT Fire and Emergency Act

Emergency services in the Northern Territory
Fire and rescue services of Australia
1941 establishments in Australia